Sean Averell Pybus (born September 22, 1957) is a retired United States Navy Vice Admiral who last served as the deputy Commander, U.S. Special Operations Command (USSOCOM) from 2014 to 2016. He previously served as the Commander, Naval Special Warfare Command from 2011 to 2013.

Military career
Pybus graduated from University of Rochester in 1979 and was commissioned through the Navy Reserve Officers Training Corps. After his commission as an ensign in the U.S. Navy, he reported to Basic Underwater Demolition/Sea, Air, Land training in Coronado, Calif. He graduated with BUD/S class 105 in December 1979. Following SEAL Tactical Training and completion of six month probationary period, he received the 1130 designator as a Naval Special Warfare Officer, entitled to wear the Special Warfare insignia. He has served operationally in an Underwater Demolition Team, SEAL Team, SEAL Delivery Vehicle Team and Special Boat Team. As a platoon commander with SEAL Team ONE, Pybus completed a deployment to the Philippines. In 1984, Pybus was assigned to SEAL Team Six and completed a grueling selection and training course. Pybus went on to serve as Assault Squadron Commander during the Achille Lauro hijacking. Pybus has participated in several classified contingency operations and has served as a SEAL platoon commander, joint special operations staff officer and executive officer, SEAL Team TWO. His overseas assignments include service in Latin America, Europe, Africa and Asia. Pybus earned a Master of Arts degree in Strategic Studies at the Naval War College in 1998. He served command tours of Naval Special Warfare Unit 2 in Germany and Commodore of Naval Special Warfare Group 1 from July 2005 to Jun 2007. Pybus was promoted to rear admiral in 2007 and subsequently served as Director of Operations, J-3, United States Special Operations Command (USSOCOM), 2007-2009 followed by assignment to Camp H.M. Smith, Hawaii as Commander, Special Operations Command Pacific from 2009-2011. Pybus became Commander, Naval Special Warfare Command in Coronado, California from 2011 to 2013. In 2013 he was promoted to vice admiral and assigned to NATO Special Operations Headquarters in Mons, Belgium. His last position before retirement was as deputy commander, USSOCOM, MacDill Air Force Base, Florida, 2014-2016.

This article contains material from the United States Federal Government and is in the public domain.

Awards and decorations

References

External links
 Biography at Navy.mil

Living people
United States Navy vice admirals
United States Navy SEALs personnel
University of Rochester alumni
Naval War College alumni
Recipients of the Defense Distinguished Service Medal
Recipients of the Navy Distinguished Service Medal
1957 births